Axmouth is a village, civil parish and former manor in the East Devon district of Devon, England, near the mouth of the River Axe. The parish extends along the estuary to the sea, and a significant distance to the east. The village is near Seaton and Beer which are on the other side of the Axe estuary. According to the 2001 census the parish had a population of 493.

History

In the will of King Alfred the Great, a copy of which is in the British Library, Axmouth was left to his youngest son Aethelweard.

According to Historic England, 'Axmouth was ranked as a major port by the mid-14th century and accounted for 15% of the country’s shipping trade'.
The remains of a late medieval fishing boat can be seen at low tide in the River Axe, just south-west of the village.

Historic estates
Within the parish of Axmouth are various historic estates including:
Bindon, an ancient seat of the Wyke family, and inherited on marriage to Mary Wyke by Walter Erle (died 1581) of Colcombe in the parish of Colyton in Devon, an officer of the Privy Chamber to King Edward VI and to his sisters Queen Mary I and Queen Elizabeth I. Erle purchased the manor of Axmouth following the Dissolution of Syon Monastery of which it had been a possession.

Stedcombe House is a Grade I listed William and Mary house and estate, to the north of Axmouth village. It was built in about 1697 by Richard Hallett on the site of the earlier Stedcombe House, that was destroyed during the English Civil War. The Hallett family acquired the estate in 1691 from Sir Walter Yonge of Escot.

Architecture

The village includes some thatched cottages, the church has a fifteenth-century tower and a carved Norman doorway and pillars. The Tudor period Bindon House is nearby and the remains of a hillfort can be seen on Hawkesdown Hill above the village. An early concrete bridge crosses the mouth of the river close to the harbour which is home to a yacht club. There is also a golf course.

References

External links
 
 Devon Local Studies - Axmouth community page
 

Villages in Devon